Kochu Themmadi is a 1986 Indian Malayalam film, directed by A. Vincent and produced by Sobhana Parameswaran Nair. The film stars Mammootty, Adoor Bhasi, Sunanda and Sreenivasan in the lead roles. The film has musical score by G. Devarajan.

Plot summary
Unni lives as a servant's son in his maternal home. His father is a drunkard and doesn't take care off him. He is good in studies but gets involved with bad friends and their influences. A new teacher joins the school, Shekharan. Shekharan is feared by students, he is a disabled ex-serviceman. Shekharan takes special interest in Unni because he used to love his mother in his youth. He tries to lead the students to a better path but all of them doesn't go in his way. Will he be able to persuade them or whether fate has a different plan for him forms the climax of the story.

Cast
Mammootty as Shekharan.
Adoor Bhasi as Headmaster.
Bahadoor as Kellapan Nair, Ravi's driver.
Sunanda as Ammini.
Sreenivasan as P.T. Master.
Jalaja as Madhavikutty, Unni's Mother.
Jagathy Sreekumar as Mesthari.
Vineeth Radhakrishnan as Unni.
Cochin Haneefa as Hanifa
Sherin as Ravi.
Santhakumari as Nanniyamma.
Prathima as Devika, as Ravi's mother.
Premji

Soundtrack
The music was composed by G. Devarajan and the lyrics were written by P. Bhaskaran.

References

External links
 

1986 films
1980s Malayalam-language films
Films directed by A. Vincent